Wilderness is an upcoming television series produced for Amazon Prime Video based on the novel of the same name by B.E. Jones. It stars Jenna Coleman and Oliver Jackson-Cohen.

Synopsis
A dream holiday becomes a nightmare for a young British couple who seemingly have it all, as heartbreak turns into fury and revenge.

Cast
 Jenna Coleman as Liv
 Oliver Jackson-Cohen as Will
 Ashley Benson as Cara
 Eric Balfour as Garth
 Claire Rushbrook as Caryl
 Marsha Stephanie Blake as Detective Rawlings
 Morgana Van Peebles as Ash
 Jonathan Keltz as Detective Wiseman
 Talia Balsam as Bonnie
 Crystal Balint as Liana
 Natalie Sharp as Marissa
 Geoff Gustafson as Zach
 Jake Foy as Anton

Production
The series is based upon the 2017 novel Wilderness written by B.E. Jones; the book was adapted for television by Marnie Dickens. Filming began in April 2022 with filming scheduled in Vancouver, Las Vegas, the Grand Canyon, and New York.; additional filming also took place in the U.K. Dickens was quoted as saying “Wilderness is pure, unadulterated fun, where our heroine Liv says the things you wish you had the guts to, does the things you can only fantasise about, and lives by her own increasingly outrageous set of rules. I'm thrilled to bring the Prime Video audience along for her ride.” Director So Yong Kim executive produced alongside Dickens and Elizabeth Kilgarriff for Firebird Pictures. Lead actress Coleman said, “I'm very much looking forward to getting on the road, into the wilderness and the depths beyond. Working alongside Oliver, we will be exploring the boundaries of a relationship that is tested in unimaginable ways and in the hands of the wonderful So Yong Kim, Marnie Dickens, and Liz Kilgarriff at Firebird Pictures. I know this is going to make for an extraordinary trip.” In July 2022, Ashley Benson, Eric Balfour, Marsha Stephanie Blake and Morgana Van Peebles were announced as added to the cast.

Release
The series is expected to debut in 2023 on Amazon Prime.

References

External links
 

2023 British television series debuts
2020s British drama television series
Amazon Prime Video original programming
English-language television shows
Serial drama television series
Television series by Amazon Studios
Television shows based on British novels
Upcoming drama television series